is the name NHK gives to the annual year-long historical drama television series it broadcasts in Japan. Beginning in 1963 with the black-and-white Hana no Shōgai, starring kabuki actor Onoe Shoroku II and Awashima Chikage, the network regularly hires different writers, directors, and other creative staff for each taiga drama. The 45-minute show airs on the NHK General TV network every Sunday at 20:00, with rebroadcasts on Saturdays at 13:05. NHK BS Premium and NHK World Premium broadcasts are also available.

Taiga dramas are very costly to produce. The usual procedure of a taiga drama production would have one-third of the total number of scripts finished before shooting begins. Afterwards, audience reception is taken into account as the rest of the series is written. Many times, the dramas are adapted from a novel (e.g. Fūrin Kazan is based on The Samurai Banner of Furin Kazan). Though taiga dramas have been regarded by Japanese viewers as the most prestigious among dramas in Japan, viewership ratings have considerably declined in recent years.

Current series
What Will You Do, Ieyasu? (2023)

Upcoming series
Hikaru Kimi e (2024)

List of series

NHK Special Drama
Saka no Ue no Kumo was originally set for a 2006 broadcast as "21st Century Taiga Drama". However, the scriptwriter of the series committed suicide, causing a delay in production. The series was aired as "NHK Special Drama" in three parts, each part airing from late November to late December of each year.

Fantasy taiga drama

New Big Jidaigeki

Series overviews

Kōmyō-ga-tsuji: Yamauchi Kazutoyo no Tsuma. Takaya Kamikawa plays the role of Yamauchi Kazutoyo, the military commander and daimyō who took over the Tosa han and built Kōchi Castle. Nakama Yukie plays the role of Chiyo, the ever-supporting wife of Kazutoyo. The story by Shiba Ryōtarō spans the closing years of the Sengoku period, the Azuchi–Momoyama period, and the beginning of the Edo period.
武蔵 MUSASHI (2003). Kabuki actor Ichikawa Shinnosuke VII (now Ichikawa Ebizō XI) held the lead role as the swordsman Miyamoto Musashi, whose lives spanned the end of the sengoku and the beginning of the Edo periods. The series was based on the Yoshikawa Eiji novel that forms the basis for most modern fiction based on the events of Musashi's life. This was the first Taiga Drama to have its title in both kanji and the Latin alphabet.
Toshiie and Matsu (2002). Toshiaki Karasawa as Maeda Toshiie and Nanako Matsushima as Matsu recounted the establishment of the Tokugawa shogunate from the point of view of an outside daimyō.
Hōjō Tokimune (2001). Kyōgen actor Izumi Motoya played the lead character, heading a cast that included Watanabe Ken. Major events in the series included the Mongol Invasions of Japan.
Genroku Ryōran (1999). Kabuki actor Nakamura Kankurō V played Ōishi Kuranosuke in this story set in the Genroku period, during which the events of the Forty-seven rōnin occurred.

See also
Japanese television dramas
Jidaigeki
Asadora

References

External links
Official Site 

 
Japanese drama television series
Japanese entertainment terms
NHK original programming